The East Hills railway line serves the southern and south-western suburbs of Sydney, Australia. The line opened to East Hills in 1931 and was extended to connect to the Main South line in 1987. Most services along the line form part of the Airport & South Line operated by Sydney Trains.

Alignment 

The East Hills line branches from the Illawarra line at Wolli Creek Junction, between Tempe and Arncliffe railway stations. From Wolli Creek, the line heads west towards East Hills, where the alignment is within 2 km of the since-constructed M5 South Western Motorway. It then turns south-west through the new suburbs of Voyager Point and Wattle Grove to meet the Main South line at Glenfield Junction. The line is four tracks between Wolli Creek junction and Revesby station, then two tracks to Glenfield junction. The bridge over the Georges River at East Hills, opened in 1987, is the only significant engineering structure on the line.

History 

Proposals for a line to East Hills were first raised after World War 1 as an extension of the existing line at Bankstown. In 1923, the Railway Department put forward a proposal for a railway from Tempe to Salt Pan Creek to serve the growing town of Dumbleton (later known as Beverly Hills). Residents west of Salt Pan Creek petitioned the government to extend the line to East Hills.

The New South Wales Public Works Committee approved of construction of a railway from Tempe to East Hills in August 1924 and the bill for construction of the line passed both Houses of the state Parliament in late 1924. A ceremony at Padstow Park commemorating the turning of the first sod by the then-Premier of New South Wales Jack Lang was held in September 1927.

The initial line was to be double track between Tempe and Kingsgrove and single track beyond, although earthworks were to allow future easy duplication of the entire route. Electrification was also to end at Kingsgrove. Construction began in 1927 with the employment of 400 workers, and most of the earthworks were completed in by 1930. Station names were announced in November 1929. They were largely the same as those used today with the exception of Dumbleton (present-day Beverly Hills) and Herne Bay (present-day Riverwood).

The first section to Kingsgrove opened on 21 September 1931 as an electrified double track line from Wolli Creek Junction on the Illawarra line to Kingsgrove.

The second section, a single-track non-electrified extension to East Hills, was opened on 19 December 1931 by the then-Minister for Local Government James McGirr in a ceremony at East Hills. Points to reverse trains were provided at Kingsgrove, and a passing loop was provided at Herne Bay. Services on this section were by CPH railmotor, supplemented by through steam trains from Central in peak hours. Some electric services from Kingsgrove operated through to St James station (the City Circle was not complete at that time), however most terminated at Tempe, connecting with Illawarra line services to and from the city. Complete through service commenced in 1937. The single line between Kingsgrove and East Hills was opened for electric services on 17 December 1939.

The line was duplicated between Kingsgrove and Riverwood in 1948, with points for terminating trains provided at both stations, and a passing loop at Revesby was opened in 1956. Services generally ran all stations from East Hills via Tempe and Sydenham, to the City Circle. Occasional services terminated at Riverwood, Kingsgrove and Padstow. Most trains stopped at Erskineville and St Peters, now only served by the Bankstown line.

A major link for south west Sydney
In 1985, the line was duplicated through to East Hills and on 21 December 1987 extended to Glenfield to connect with the Main South Line, allowing through services to and from Campbelltown. A new station was provided at Holsworthy, and East Hills station was rebuilt with the addition of a third platform. When services commenced on 21 December 1987, there were only limited services from Campbelltown via East Hills during peak hours only; however, in 1988 an all day half-hourly service was provided. Local (all stations) services generally ran every 15 minutes from East Hills.

In conjunction with the construction of the Airport Line, the section of the East Hills Line between Wolli Creek Junction and Kingsgrove was quadruplicated. Once this was opened, the running patterns of the trains on the lines changed. The "flying junctions" interchange near Central Station was altered to give the Airport Line its own platforms (21 & 23) at Central. Local (all stations) trains generally were timetabled to run from East Hills]l via the airport, peak hour express trains from Campbelltown run along the original route via Sydenham, taking the express tracks between Kingsgrove and Wolli Creek Junction.

The line as a whole suffered a substantial loss in patronage when the M5 East Tunnel opened in 2002. The tunnel joined the Eastern Distributor and M5 South Western Motorway, shortening road travel times between the city and the south west. The line was estimated to have lost 384,450 commuters over 12 months after the tunnel opened. Since that time, however, the line appears to have gained commuters again, with a reported 3.5% increase in patronage up to early 2006.

An additional platform and turn-back track was completed at Revesby as part of the Rail Clearways Program. From October 2009 it replaced East Hills as the primary turn-back point for local all-stations services on the line.

A second Rail Clearways project involved quadruplicating the section of track between Kingsgrove and Revesby. This enables express services between the Campbelltown area and the city to operate separately from local services between Revesby and the city. The new tracks opened on 15 April 2013. Regional trains heading southwest to Canberra and Melbourne from Sydney Central began to use the East Hills line to travel through metropolitan Sydney, instead of the Main Southern railway line through Strathfield railway station.

References

External links 
Neety's Train Page: Names and Photos of the East Hills Line – photos and explanations of station names on the line.